Palamidi is a fortress to the east of the Acronauplia in the town of Nafplio in the Peloponnese region of southern Greece.

The fortress was a very large and ambitious project, but was finished within a relatively short period from 1711 until 1714.  It is a typical baroque fortress based on the plans of Venetian engineer Antonio Giancix (Antun Jančić) and built by French military engineer Pierre de la Salle. In 1715 it was captured by the Ottomans and remained under their control until 1822, when it was captured by the Greeks.

The eight bastions of the fortress were originally named after the Venetian provveditori. However, when it fell to the Ottoman Empire, the bastions were given Turkish names. Lastly, when the Greeks overthrew the Turks the bastions were renamed after ancient Greek leaders and heroes (Epaminondas, Miltiades, Leonidas, Phocion, Achilles, Themistocles. The two remaining bastions were named after St. Andrew (Agios Andreas) and the French Philhellene Robert who died in battle on the Acropolis of Athens. The "Miltiades," was used as a prison and among its walls was also held Theodoros Kolokotronis, hero of the Greek Revolution.

The fortress commands an impressive view over the Argolic Gulf, the city of Náfplio and the surrounding country.  There are 913 steps in the winding stair from the town to the fortress. However, to reach the top of the fortress there are over one thousand. Locals in the town of Nafplion will say there are 999 steps to the top of the castle, and specials can be found on menus that incorporate this number to catch a tourist's eye.

Gallery

References

Bibliography 
 Takis MAVROS, Palamidi. A Brief History of the Fortress of Nafplion, Athens, 1990.

External links

 Palamidi

Castles in the Peloponnese
Tourist attractions in Peloponnese (region)
Venetian fortifications in Greece
Nafplion
Buildings and structures in Argolis
Articles containing video clips
18th-century architecture in Greece
Natura 2000 in Greece